North Carolina's 24th Senate district is one of 50 districts in the North Carolina Senate. It has been represented by Republican Danny Britt since 2023.

Geography
Since 2023, the district has included all of Robeson, Hoke, and Scotland counties. The district overlaps with the 46th, 47th, and 48th state house districts.

District officeholders

Election results

2022

2020

2018

2016

2014

2012

2010

2008

2006

2004

2002

2000

References

North Carolina Senate districts
Robeson County, North Carolina
Hoke County, North Carolina
Scotland County, North Carolina